Gordon Lewis may refer to:

Gordon Lewis (rugby) (born 1936), Welsh rugby union and rugby league footballer
Gordon Lewis (engineer) (1924–2010), British aeronautical engineer
Gordon K. Lewis (1919–1991), Welsh radical historian of the Caribbean